This is a list of lighthouses in Saint Barthélemy.

Lighthouses

See also
 Lists of lighthouses and lightvessels

References

External links
 

Lighthouses
Lighthouses in Saint Barthélemy
Saint Barthélemy